Nixon is an unincorporated community located within Edison Township in Middlesex County, New Jersey, United States. It was named after Lewis Nixon, a manufacturer and community leader. Soon after the outbreak of World War I, Nixon established a massive volatile chemicals processing facility there, known as the Nixon Nitration Works. It was the site of the 1924 Nixon Nitration Works disaster, a massive explosion and resulting fire that killed 20 persons and destroyed several square miles around the plant.

See also
List of neighborhoods in Edison, New Jersey

References

Neighborhoods in Edison, New Jersey
Unincorporated communities in Middlesex County, New Jersey
Unincorporated communities in New Jersey